Cadeo (Piacentino:  or ) is a town and comune (municipality) in the Province of Piacenza in the Italian region Emilia-Romagna, located about  northwest of Bologna and about  southeast of Piacenza. It has about 5,600 inhabitants. The name is derived from Italian, meaning "House of God." This refers to a time when Cadeo was a stop-over for Christian pilgrims. The photo of the church accompanying this article is actually on the Via Emilia in Roveleto.

Cadeo borders the following municipalities: Carpaneto Piacentino, Cortemaggiore, Fiorenzuola d'Arda, Pontenure. The Municipal Building for Cadeo is located in Roveleto, which is to the south-east on the Via Emilia. Roveleto is also the site of the closest railroad station to Cadeo.

Demographic evolution

Twin towns
Cadeo is twinned with:

  Marsaxlokk, Malta

References

External links
 www.provincia.piacenza.it/Comuni/htm/cadeo.htm

Cities and towns in Emilia-Romagna